The Associação Carlos Barbosa de Futsal, usually known as Carlos Barbosa or by the acronym ACBF, is a Brazilian futsal club from Carlos Barbosa, Rio Grande do Sul state. Founded  on March 1, 1973, it is one of the most successful clubs of the sport in Brazil.

History
Associação Carlos Barbosa de Futsal was founded on March 1, 1973, after two local Carlos Barbosa city clubs, Real and River, fused. The club color, orange, was chosen after the 1974 FIFA World Cup Netherlands national football team.

In 1996, the club won the state championship. Five years later, Carlos Barbosa won for the first time both the Taça Brasil de Futsal and the Liga Futsal.

In 2002 and in 2003, Carlos Barbosa won both the South American Club Futsal Championship and the Recopa de América.

In 2004, the club won the first Intercontinental Futsal Cup organized by FIFA, which took place in Barcelona, Spain. Carlos Barbosa beat Playas de Castellón FS of Spain 6-3 in the final.

Titles

National
 Liga Futsal: 2001, 2004, 2006, 2009, 2015
 Taça Brasil de Futsal: 2001, 2009, 2016
 Campeonato Gaúcho (Série Ouro): 1996, 1997, 1999, 2002, 2004, 2008, 2009, 2010, 2012, 2013, 2015
 Copa Ulbra/Torres: 2006

International
 Intercontinental Futsal Cup: 2001, 2004, 2012
 South American Club Futsal Championship: 2002, 2003, 2010, 2011, 2017, 2018

Home arena
Carlos Barbosa's home arena is Centro Municipal de Eventos, inaugurated on December 17, 2000, which has a maximum capacity of 6,500 people. The Centro Municipal de Eventos replaced the club's previous stadium, Ginásio da Tramontina, which has a maximum capacity of 3,000 people.

Current squad

Rivals
Carlos Barbosa rivals are Associação Farroupilhense de Futsal, based in the neighbouring municipality of Farroupilha, and Malwee/Jaraguá, of Jaraguá do Sul, Santa Catarina.

External links

 Associação Carlos Barbosa de Futsal's official website

Futsal clubs established in 1976
1976 establishments in Brazil
Futsal clubs in Brazil
Sports teams in Rio Grande do Sul